This is a discography of Pretty Maids, a Danish hard rock/heavy metal band from Horsens, Denmark, consists of 16 studio albums, three live albums, four extended plays, and two compilation albums.

Albums

Studio albums

Notes
 Released as Lethal Heroes in the United States and Japan.

Live albums

Extended plays

Compilation albums

References

External links
Pretty Maids discography at Prettymaids.dk

Heavy metal group discographies
Discographies of Danish artists